"Playboys of the Southwestern World" is a song written by Neal Coty and Randy VanWarmer and recorded by American country music artist Blake Shelton. It was released in July 2003 as the third single from Shelton's album The Dreamer.  The song reached number 24 on the US Billboard Hot Country Singles & Tracks chart.

Content 
The narrator (Romeo) and his wild-child neighbor and childhood friend, John Roy, are two teens who enroll in a small Texas college. John Roy decides from a young age that he and Romeo should go down to Mexico to pick up girls and party. With cash in hand, the two sneak across the Mexican border but are immediately caught by a border patrolman, who suspects illegal activity and threatens them with "ten years in a Mexican jail." Romeo, in a desperate attempt at self-preservation, blames John Roy for everything; the attempt fails, and both end up as "temporary cellmates." Both remain best friends after the ordeal.

The chorus quotes a portion of Van Morrison's "Brown Eyed Girl", as well as interpolating the "sha-la-la-la" vocal.

Chart performance

References

2003 singles
Blake Shelton songs
Songs written by Neal Coty
Songs written by Randy VanWarmer
Warner Records Nashville singles
2003 songs